Drummond North is a locality in the Shire of Hepburn, Victoria, Australia. The locality is mainly a wine-growing and livestock region. Back Creek, a tributary of the Coliban River, runs through the locality, creating a 30-degree hill. Native wildlife includes kangaroos which are plentiful in number. Drummond North Post Office opened on 1 April 1885 and closed in 1956. At the 2016 census, Drummond North had a population of 187.

References

Towns in Victoria (Australia)